Tebesbest is a town and commune in Touggourt District, Touggourt Province, Algeria, and forms a part of the urban area of Touggourt. According to the 2008 census it has a population of 35,032, up from 29,840 in 1998, and a population growth rate of 1.7%. It is a predominantly agricultural community, with dates being the main product.

Localities
The commune is composed of seven localities:

Quartier de Tebesbest
Lebdouat
Beni Assoued
Ayad
Z.H.U.N.
El Bahdja I
El Bahdja II

References

Neighbouring towns and cities

Communes of Ouargla Province
Cities in Algeria
Algeria